Chele Arena is a multi-use stadium in Kobuleti, Georgia.  It is used mostly for football matches and is the home stadium of FC Shukura Kobuleti and FC Dinamo Batumi until 2020. The stadium is able to hold 6,000 people.

The stadium was named after Revaz Chelebadze, the most famous player to come from Kobuleti. Chelebadze won Soviet Championship in 1978 and Soviet Cup in 1976 and 1979 all with Dinamo Tbilisi. He also played for USSR National Team and became a bronze medal winner in 1980 Olympic Games in Moscow.

See also 
Stadiums in Georgia

Sports venues in Georgia (country)
Football venues in Georgia (country)
Buildings and structures in Adjara